Drunken Silenus is a painting by Jusepe de Ribera, produced in 1626 in Naples and now in the Museo di Capodimonte in Naples.

The central figure is Silenus, lying on a cloth and offering a wine cup to the figure behind him. To the right is Pan, crowning Silenus with vines and surrounded by a shell (the symbol announcing his death) and a turtle (symbol of laziness). At the bottom right is a snake symbolising wisdom.

History
Its first recorded owner was the Flemish merchant Gaspar Roomer, but he did not commission the work, since he first acquired it several years after the artist's death. At the end of the 18th century it entered the collection of the House of Bourbon-Two Sicilies as part of their possessions in Naples, bringing it to the Capodimonte.

References

External links
http://assistentimuseali.xoom.it/atm2003/silenoebbro.htm 

1626 paintings
Paintings in the collection of the Museo di Capodimonte
Paintings by Jusepe de Ribera
Paintings depicting Greek myths
Food and drink paintings
Pan (god) in art
Seashells in art
Snakes in art
Turtles in art
Silenus